Spasskaya Tower of the Moscow Kremlin
 Spasskaya (Saint Petersburg Metro)